The Drama Desk Award for Outstanding Costume Design is an annual award presented by Drama Desk in recognition of achievements in the theatre among Broadway, Off Broadway and Off-Off Broadway productions.

Winners and nominees

1960s

1970s

1980s

1990s

2000s

2010s

See also
 Laurence Olivier Award for Best Costume Design
 Tony Award for Best Costume Design

References

External links
 Drama Desk official website

Costume Design